The 100 Series are a series of underground railway cars manufactured by Alstom in Brazil and Argentina for use on the Buenos Aires Underground. They are used on Line D of the network, where they make up the vast majority of the fleet, serving alongside some 300 Series and Fiat-Materfer cars. Since 2019, some units have also been used on the Line E.

History

The 100 Series was initially purchased for use on Line A to replace the ageing La Brugeoise cars, however they ended up replacing the slightly newer Siemens-Schuckert Orenstein & Koppel cars which were allocated to Line D instead. 

Originally, the purchase consisted of 80 cars for a total of 16 trains made up of 5 cars each, due to the shorter platform length on Line A. However, 16 more 100 Series cars were purchased up until 2009, making a total of 96 cars and allowing each train to have 6 cars, making full use of the line's platforms.

In 2015 the cars began to receive a mid-life refurbishment, primarily to add air conditioning, but also incorporating enhancements to the interior such as improved lighting and new upholstery. Despite enjoying a successful service life, they are also the noisiest cars on the network.

Between 2017 and 2019 New Alstom 300 Series cars replaced the Fiat-Materfer cars and serve alongside the existing 100 Series cars.

See also

Buenos Aires Underground rolling stock
Alstom Metropolis
Buenos Aires Underground 200 Series
Buenos Aires Underground 300 Series

References

Rolling stock of the Buenos Aires Underground
Alstom multiple units